Denise Anne Christina Drysdale (born 5 December 1948) is an Australian television presenter, variety entertainer, actress, singer, dancer and comedian. She is often affectionately known as Ding Dong, a nickname invented by fellow performer Ernie Sigley. She is currently a co-host of the morning show Studio 10.

Early life

Childhood 
Born in the Melbourne suburb of Moorabbin, Drysdale and her family moved to Port Melbourne when she was three-and-a-half, where her parents ran the Fountain Inn Hotel. They lived there for eleven years, during which time Drysdale attended Kilbride Ladies Convent, South Melbourne.

Career beginnings 
Drysdale's career began soon after the move to Port Melbourne. Referring to the (then) regulations for public bars to cease serving alcohol at 6pm, she observed:

"During that time it was the 6 o'clock swill, and Mum didn't want her little girl seeing all that drinking, so she sent me to dancing, to May Downs. May Downs was an amazing woman. She taught us 150% is what you gave in any performance, or don't bother. And of course, that's got me into strife over the years."

By the age of six, Drysdale had won a number of dancing competitions.

At about ten years of age, she began her television career with GTV9 in Melbourne, working in the junior ballet on the Tarax Show. She was later sacked when she gained weight and developed breasts.

"We'd been there about a year and a bit, and on the holidays I had put on weight, but not much, and as you know, if you put someone in a nice tutu, they don't have bosoms—they have very flat chests. Pete Smith always said, "You grew boobs, they had to get rid of you." They couldn't do it today. And I've suffered to this day. I still stand on the scales six times a day to check whether I've put on half a pound or a pound."

Photographed at the time by a Channel Nine photographer, Drysdale went on to win the annual Girl of the Year Award with Everybody's in 1964.

At age seventeen, Drysdale joined the new show Kommotion as a go-go girl, becoming Melbourne's first go-go dancer.

Drysdale was invited to tour Australia with Ray Brown & the Whispers. She was then offered a recording contract and appeared in 26 episodes of the ABC's Dig We Must.

Career 

In the 1960s, Drysdale appeared as a dancer on In Melbourne Tonight. In 1966, she performed on The Go!! Show, and was voted third most popular female vocalist by the readers of Go-Set. This popularity led to an invitation to perform for the troops in Vietnam for three weeks in 1967, along with Patti Newton, the Strangers, and Doug Owen. In 1969, she went to the Far East to entertain American troops.

In 1974, she became Ernie Sigley's barrel girl on The Ernie Sigley Show. It was here she gained the nickname Ding Dong. In 1975, Drysdale and Sigley released a single "Hey Paula" as a duet, which reached #2 on the Australian charts, Later that year she won the TV Week Gold Logie for the Most Popular Female Personality on Australian TV, and won her second Gold Logie the following year. In the same period, she also won consecutive Silver Logies.

Drysdale has appeared on numerous television shows, including The Norman Gunston Show, Celebrity Squares, Young Talent Time, Countdown, Division 4, Homicide, Bellbird and Celebrity Name Game. She has also worked in regional television in Victoria including guest appearances on BTV-6 Ballarat and hosting a morning magazine show on GLV-8 in the 1980s. As an actress, she has appeared in the movies The Last of the Knucklemen, Snapshot, and Blowing Hot and Cold.

On stage, she has appeared in plays and musicals, including Salad Days, Grease, The Barry Crocker Show, Two Gentlemen of Verona and Hello, Dolly! in 1994. She also spent two years in Sydney appearing on television shows Beauty and the Beast and "Weekend Sydney" between 1981 and 1983 before returning to her home town of Melbourne, Victoria.

In 1989, Drysdale joined Ernie Sigley to host In Melbourne Today, and in 1991 began a Sydney version of the show In Sydney Today. The two programs later merged to a single program: Ernie and Denise. Also in 1989, she was asked to fill in on Hey Hey It's Saturday due to Jacki MacDonald being ill and subsequently leaving. Drysdale stayed with the show for over a year before leaving due to ongoing rumours of a feud between her and host Daryl Somers. Over the years both have denied such rumours. In 1994, Drysdale returned to host an episode of Hey Hey It's Saturday in Somers' absence. She also returned for one of the reunion shows in 2009.

In the late 1990s Drysdale appeared in the reboot of IMT on the Nine Network.

In 1998, she joined the Seven Network to present her own show for the first time, called Denise. This program lasted four seasons.

In 2005, Channel 9 chose Drysdale as one of the 50 most important people on television for the last 50 years.

On 7 October 2010 she made an appearance in the second of the Hey Hey It's Saturday reunion shows.

In 2010, Drysdale joined Network Ten's new morning show The Circle alongside Yumi Stynes, Chrissie Swan and Gorgi Coghlan as host. She remained on the show for two seasons, leaving at the end of the 2011 season. She reappeared as a special guest on the final episode in 2013.

Drysdale regularly performed around Australia on the club circuit, often with her television partner, Ernie Sigley.

It was announced Drysdale would join as permanent co-host of Studio 10 in 2016 after appearing as a regular fill-in presenter, sharing the position with Ita Buttrose.

In June 2018, Drysdale joined the cast of Neighbours as Nance Sluggett. She made her first appearance on 3 October 2018.

Film

Television

Stage and Theatre
 Buttons (1972)
 Grease (1972)
 Dimboola (1975)
 The Sentimental Bloke (1976)
 The Barry Crocker Show (1979)
 Two Gentlemen Of Verona (1980)
 Salad Days (1983)
 Hello Dolly! (1994-1995)

Discography

Charting singles

Awards and nominations

Go-Set Pop Poll 
The Go-Set Pop Poll was coordinated by teen-oriented pop music newspaper Go-Set and was established in February 1966 and conducted an annual poll during 1966 to 1972 of its readers to determine the most popular personalities.

|-
| 1966
| herself
| Female Vocal
| style="background:tan;"| 3rd

Logie Awards 
The Logie Awards (officially the TV Week Logie Awards) is an annual gathering to celebrate Australian television, sponsored and organised by magazine TV Week, with the first ceremony in 1959, known then as the TV Week Awards, the awards are presented in 20 categories representing both public and industry voted awards. Drysdale has won two Gold Logie awards for Most Popular Female Personality on Australian television.

|-bgcolor=gold
| Logie Awards of 1975
| herself
| rowspan="2"| Gold Logie
| 
|-bgcolor=gold
| Logie Awards of 1976
| herself
| 

In 1998, as part of Melbourne's Moomba Festival, Drysdale was crowned 'Moomba Monarch'.

In January 2008, Drysdale was awarded the 'Australia Day Citizen of the Year' award by Baw Baw Shire.

In 2018, Drysdale was honoured by Australia Post with her portrait featuring on a special collection of post stamps issued as part of "The Legends of Television" series.

Personal life 
Drysdale has two sons, and at least one grandson.

References

External links 

Drysdale on the "GO! show in 1966
Drysdale being presented with a Gold Logie by John Wayne in 1975

1948 births
Living people
Australian women comedians
Australian women singers
Australian film actresses
Australian television presenters
Gold Logie winners
Television personalities from Melbourne
Australian stage actresses
Actresses from Melbourne
Australian women television presenters
People from Port Melbourne